Wonder en is gheen Wonder (Mystery is no Mystery) is a popular science magazine of the Flemish skeptical association SKEPP. The paper was founded in 2000 by Tom Schoepen, who also served as its editor for its first ten years. The magazine is published four times a year and addresses pseudoscientific as well as science philosophical topics. The title is a reference to the 16th century Flemish mathematician and engineer Simon Stevin's commentary to his famous thought experiment: even if something looks strange, it can still have a naturalistic explanation. The subtitle Tijdschrift voor wetenschap en rede ("Magazine for science and reason") was taken from Skeptical Inquirer, the most world-renowned skeptical magazine that is published by the Committee for Skeptical Inquiry.

As of 2016, the editorial staff is composed as follows:
Core staff
 Bart Coenen (editor-in-chief)
 Cliff Beeckman
 Johan Braeckman
 Tim Trachet
 Luc Vancampenhout
 Pieter Van Nuffel
 Wietse Wiels

Editorial committee
 Wim Betz
 Stefaan Blancke
 Luc Bonneux
 Maarten Boudry
 Maxime Darge
 Geerdt Magiels
 Ronny Martens
 Marc Meuleman
 Pieter Peyskens
 Griet Vandermassen
 Frank Verhoft

See also 
 Critical thinking
 Freethought
 Skepter
 Skeptic (U.S. magazine)
 Skeptical Inquirer
 Snopes.com
 The Freethinker (journal)
 The Skeptic (UK magazine)
 The Skeptic's Dictionary

References

External links
 Official website

2000 establishments in Belgium
Dutch-language magazines
Magazines established in 2000
Magazines published in Brussels
Magazines published in Flanders
Paranormal magazines
Popular science magazines
Quarterly magazines
Scientific skepticism mass media
Science and technology magazines